Adamuz is a municipality and a city of Spain located in the province of Córdoba, Andalusia. The municipality also includes the village of Algallarín.

Climate and vegetation
Adamuz has a typically Mediterranean climate with high sunshine and low rainfall, which is almost non-existent during the summer.

The vegetation is characteristic of Mediterranean forests.

Main sights
The Communal forest  is an estate of 2,500 hectares, owned by the city and flanked by two rivers, which retain their winter waters through small dams. It is crossed from north to south along the road between the Valley Adamuz of Pedroches.
Clock Tower,  built in 1566 by  Luis Méndez de Haro, Marques del Carpio. It has a height of 15 meters.
Chapel of St. Pius V
Parish Church of St. Andrew the Apostle (13th century). It has a nave and two aisles  without a transept. It houses a polychrome altar in gold leaf. The high square bell tower has internal spiral stairs. The church was renovated in the 16th century by Hernán Ruiz the Elder.

References

External links
Adamuz - Sistema de Información Multiterritorial de Andalucía

Municipalities in the Province of Córdoba (Spain)